The Aston Martin Autosport BRDC Award is an award set up in 1989 to reward and recognise young racing drivers from the UK. As its names suggest, the award is backed by Aston Martin, motorsport magazine Autosport, and the British Racing Drivers' Club (BRDC). As well as the prestige of winning the award, a test drive in an Aston Martin Formula One car and £100,000 – increased from £50,000 in 2010 – cash prize, the award winner is also presented with the Chris Bristow Trophy.

McLaren ended its longstanding partnership with the accolade in January 2019, and Aston Martin replaced them. The 2019 winner received a test in a Red Bull F1 car at Silverstone, as Aston Martin was the team's sponsor. After 2020, the winner ran in an Aston Martin F1 Team car. The winner also gets a run in an FIA World Endurance Championship Aston Martin Vantage GTE car. The award also has an overall £200,000 prize fund.

Procedure
Members of the public are invited to nominate drivers for the award and a shortlist of six finalists is decided upon by the award's judging panel. The finalists then spend two or three days at a British circuit in mid-November driving different types of car to evaluate their performance as well as interview sessions with the panel. The winner is announced at the annual Autosport Awards in early December.

Past winners and nominees
 A total of 134 drivers have been nominated for the prize since it was first handed out.

References

Motorsport in the United Kingdom
Auto racing trophies and awards
McLaren Group